Roberto Pineda (July 29, 1952 – May 3, 1978) was a Mexican jockey who competed in Thoroughbred horse racing in the United States.

Racing at Pimlico Race Course in Baltimore, Maryland, on May 3, 1978, Roberto Pineda was in an accident that took his life. All three jockeys were seriously injured, with Pineda dying later that day.

For the Pineda family, this was the second such racing tragedy. Roberto's older brother, Alvaro, a top jockey in California who had won the 1974 George Woolf Memorial Jockey Award, was also killed in a freak starting gate accident at Santa Anita Park in 1975. By coincidence, and underscoring the dangers to jockeys, 1973 Triple Crown-winning jockey Ron Turcotte, brother of Rudy, was in a separate accident that same month, in which he suffered a broken neck and became a paraplegic.

Pineda was survived by his wife Maxine and their two sons, Roberto Jr and Alvaro Cipriano.

Roberto and his brother Álvaro are buried in Forest Lawn Memorial Park Glendale Los Angeles County California in plot: Garden of Honor, Lot 6820–1.

References
 May 03, 1978  CBS News report on the accident that took the life of Roberto Pineda

1952 births
1978 deaths
American jockeys
American sportspeople of Mexican descent
Jockeys who died while racing
Mexican jockeys
Sports deaths in Maryland
Mexican emigrants to the United States